Munychryia is a genus of moths of the Anthelidae family.

Species
 Munychryia senicula Walker, 1865
 Munychryia periclyta Common & McFarland, 1970

References

Anthelidae